Yvonne Verbeeck (7 December 1913 – 26 February 2012) was a Belgian Flemish actress known for roles in theater and television. She appeared in several Belgian films as well. Her last role was in the 2008 television series, Zone Stad. A bronze bust of Verbeeck is dedicated in her birthplace, Rumst.

Verbeeck died at the Nottebohm nursing home in Antwerp, where she had lived since 2006, on 26 February  2012, aged 98. Her funeral was held at the Cathedral of Our Lady in Antwerp.

References

External links

1913 births
2012 deaths
Belgian television actresses
Belgian film actresses
Belgian stage actresses
People from Rumst
Belgian Roman Catholics
20th-century Belgian actresses
21st-century Belgian actresses